The Französisches Gymnasium is a long-existing francophone gymnasium in Berlin, Germany. Traditionally, it is widely regarded as an elite high school. It is also the oldest public school in Berlin. Its creation was ordered by Frederick William of Brandenburg.

History
It was founded in 1689 by Frederick William's son Elector Frederick III of Brandenburg for the children of the Huguenot families who had settled in Brandenburg-Prussia by his invitation, being persecuted for their Protestant beliefs in the Catholic Kingdom of France after the Revocation of the Edict of Nantes by King Louis XIV in October 1685. Its first headmaster was the French jurist Charles Ancillon from Metz.

Since its foundation, the school has had an almost continuous history, occupying several buildings in Berlin. In the beginning, the faculty comprised Huguenot refugees only and the language of education was French. The school soon was attended also by numerous German children of school fee paying Prussian nobles and officials, and developed into an elite school.

In the course of the Prussian reforms, the Collège Français became a common public school in 1809. In view of the growing numbers of pupils, it moved into a larger building built on Reichstagsufer in the Dorotheenstadt quarter in 1873. The school was attended by an above-average number of Jewish pupils, who under the Nazi regime — like Jewish teachers — were harassed and finally excluded in 1938. However, despite all nationalist efforts, the French language remained the medium of teaching. After 1943 the school was evacuated from Berlin and the historic school building on Reichstagsufer was destroyed in 1945.

After the war, the school moved to the Wedding district in the French sector of what was to become West Berlin. In 1952 the Französisches Gymnasium — Collège Français Berlin was re-established by merging the traditional Huguenot school with the Berlin collège of the French Armed Forces.

Several of its pupils (though not all graduated) became prominent in later life, among them the poet Adalbert von Chamisso, the authors Maximilian Harden and Kurt Tucholsky, the engineer Walter Dornberger and the resistance fighter Adam von Trott zu Solz, the songwriters Reinhard Mey and Ulrich Roski, as well as political scientist Gesine Schwan, the presidential candidate of the Social Democratic Party of Germany in 2009.

Today
The school moved to its current building, in Berlin-Tiergarten, on Derfflingerstraße, not far from Nollendorfplatz
in 1972, after it had been located in Berlin-Reinickendorf. It educates both German- and French-speaking pupils from francophone countries all over the world. Grades are from 5 to 12, with bilingual classes and teaching starting in grade 7. Other languages that are taught are English, Latin, Ancient Greek and Spanish. Pupils can graduate with either of two diplomas though many Germans pass both: the Abitur (German high school diploma) and the Baccalauréat (French high school diploma).

Notable people

Faculty and staff 
 Charles Ancillon (1659–1715), jurist and diplomat
 Paul Erman (1764–1851), physicist
 Georg Adolf Erman (1806–1877), physicist
 Ernst Curtius (1814–1896), archaeologist and historian
 Alfred Clebsch (1833–1872), mathematician
 Hermann Wilhelm Ebel (1820–1875), philologist
 Karl Ploetz (1819–1881), author

Alumni 
 Johann Heinrich Samuel Formey (1711–1797), essayist and philosopher
 Louis de Beausobre (1730–1783), philosopher and political economist
 Ludwig Robert (1778–1832), writer
 Adelbert von Chamisso (1781–1838), poet and botanist
 Franz von Gaudy (1800–1840), poet and novelist
 Karl Ludwig Michelet (1801–1893), philosopher
 Heinrich Girard (1814–1878), mineralist and geologist
 Emil du Bois-Reymond (1818–1896), physician and physiologist
 Carl Bolle (1821–1909), naturalist and collector
 Max von Brandt (1835–1920), diplomat, East Asia expert and publicist
 Petre P. Carp (1837–1919), politician and culture critic
 Gustav Mützel (1839–1893), artist
 Paul Güssfeldt (1840–1920), geologist, mountaineer and explorer
 Alfred Woltmann (1841–1880), art historian
 Ernst von Wildenbruch (1845–1909), poet and dramatist
 Albert Moritz Wolff (1854–1923), sculptor
 Adolf Erman (1854–1937), Egyptologist
 Richard Witting (1856–1923), politician and financier
 Maximilian Harden (1861–1927), journalist and editor
 Paul von Lettow-Vorbeck (1870–1964), general
 Adolf Otto Reinhold Windaus (1876–1959), chemist, Nobel laureate
 Edmund Landau (1877–1938), mathematician
 Victor Klemperer (1881–1960), journalist and literary scholar
 Walther von Brauchitsch (1881–1948), field marshal 
 Leonard Nelson (1882–1927), mathematician and philosopher
 Kurt Tucholsky (1890–1935), journalist and writer
 Erich Auerbach (1892–1957), philologist and literary scholar
 Adam von Trott zu Solz (1909–1944), lawyer, diplomat and resistance fighter
 Joachim Werner (1909–1994), archaeologist
 Wernher von Braun (1912–1977), rocket scientist
 Gottfried Reinhardt (1913–1994), film producer and director
 Albert O. Hirschman (1915-2012), economist
 Klemens von Klemperer (1916-2012), historian
 Ken Adam (born 1921), film designer
 John Leonard Clive (1924–1990), historian
 Wolfgang Gewalt (1928–2007), zoologist
 Reinhard Mey (born 1942), singer-songwriter
 Gesine Schwan (born 1943), political science professor
 Ulrich Roski (1944–2003), singer-songwriter
 Dominique Horwitz (born 1957), actor and singer
 Christian Berkel (born 1957), actor
 Peter Fox (born 1971), musician
 Alexander Schnell (born 1971), philosopher
 Alexandra Maria Lara (born 1978), actress

See also 
 Evangelisches Gymnasium zum Grauen Kloster
 Canisius-Kolleg Berlin
 Education in Germany
 La Gazette de Berlin

German international schools in France:
 Internationale Deutsche Schule Paris
 DFG / LFA Buc
 Deutsche Schule Toulouse

References

External links

  Französisches Gymnasium Berlin

1689 establishments in the Holy Roman Empire
Educational institutions established in the 1680s
International schools in Berlin
French international schools in Germany
Huguenot history in Germany